Likewize (formerly Brightstar Corp.) is an American privately held corporation founded in 1997. It provides global wireless distribution and services, serving mobile device manufacturers, wireless operators and retailers. Likewize offers device and accessories distribution, handset protection and insurance, and mobile digital products. In 2019, Brightstar was named by Forbes as one of "America's Best Midsize Employers".

History
Brightstar was founded by Marcelo Claure in 1997.

Brightstar Corp acquired eSecuritel, an Alpharetta, GA based cell phone insurance service provider, from Mainsail Partners in April, 2011.

In October 2013, Japanese SoftBank paid $1.26 billion for a 57% stake in Brightstar.In February 2014, Brightstar Corp. completed its acquisition of 20:20 Mobile, a European mobile provider.

In July 2014, Brightstar Corp. and Bharti Enterprises announced that they entered into an agreement to have Brightstar acquire a majority stake in Beetel Teletech, a Bharti company.

In February 2015, Jaymin Patel was appointed CEO of the company, replacing Claure.

In June 2018, Brightstar acquired Next Wireless Group, an online seller of used smartphones. In August 2018, Jaymin Patel resigned as CEO of the company. Reza Taleghani, Brightstar's CFO became interim CEO of the company. As of June 2019, Rod Millar serves as CEO of the company.

In November 2019,  Brightstar acquired Risk Insure which will enable Brightstar "to broaden its portfolio in the wireless industry."

In April 2020, the company acquired WeFix. In September, SoftBank sold the company to Brightstar Capital Partners for an undisclosed amount.

In May 2021, the company left the Swedish market due to a  “unfair and discriminatory treatment” by the Swedish Tax Agency. The Swedish tax authority have made a claim of  SEK 295m (USD $35m) for outstanding VAT payments after being the company was exposed as a knowing participant in a hundred million dollar scam against the Swedish state.

In September 2021 the company announced it was rebranding to reflect a new services direction.   Under the new name “Likewize,” the company is focusing on its Protect, Repair, Renew and Support capabilities, showcasing its move to provide a range of tech services, in-store and at-home repair, recycling and support. 

The company's headquarters are located in Dallas, Texas.

References

Companies based in Miami-Dade County, Florida
Telecommunications companies of the United States
SoftBank Group
Telecommunications companies established in 1997
2013 mergers and acquisitions
American subsidiaries of foreign companies